The charts below compare hardware and firmware features in the FRITZ!Box device range.

Current models 

The following models are supported by manufacturer through firmware updates:

End-of-life models 

The following models no longer receive firmware updates:

Other device lines 

FRITZ!DECT – FRITZ!DECT 500, FRITZ!DECT 440, FRITZ!DECT 400, FRITZ!DECT 301, FRITZ!DECT 210, FRITZ!DECT 200 - home automation devices that use DECT technology
FRITZ!DECT Repeater – FRITZ!DECT Repeater 100 - DECT range extender
FRITZ!Fon: FRITZ!Fon C6, FRITZ!Fon C5, FRITZ!Fon M2 – DECT cordless phone handsets
FRITZ!Media: 8020, 8040, 8260 – set-top boxes
FRITZ!Powerline – FRITZ!Powerline 1260E (+Wi-Fi), FRITZ!Powerline 1240E (+Wi-Fi), FRITZ!Powerline 1220E, FRITZ!Powerline 546E (+ Wi-Fi + home automation), FRITZ!Powerline 540E, FRITZ!Powerline 510E Set - powerline adapters
FRITZ!WLAN Stick - FRITZ!WLAN Stick AC 860, FRITZ!WLAN Stick AC 430 MU-MIMO - wireless dongles
FRITZ!WLAN Repeater – FRITZ!Repeater 6000, FRITZ!Repeater 3000, FRITZ!Repeater 2400, FRITZ!Repeater 1200, FRITZ!Repeater 600 - wireless repeaters

References 

Broadband
Linux-based devices
Networking hardware
Telephony equipment
Fritz!Box devices